Anthology: Through the Years is a double compilation album featuring the best of Tom Petty and the Heartbreakers. It contains a new song, "Surrender," written by Petty in 1976 and recorded during sessions for the band's first album but left off the record, recorded again in 1979 but left off "Damn The Torpedoes," and finally recorded again in 2000 for this release. "Surrender" is also the last studio recording of Howie Epstein before his death in 2003. The 1976 version of the song was included on the 2018 box set An American Treasure.

Anthology: Through the Years was released on October 31, 2000, debuted at No. 132, which would mark the lowest chart-positioning on the Billboard 200 for the band. However, in November 2006, the album was certified Gold (equivalent to 500,000 copies sold) by the RIAA.  It reached a new peak of No. 32 on Billboard 200 after Petty's death in 2017.

Track listing

Personnel
Tom Petty and the Heartbreakers

Tom Petty – vocals, rhythm guitar, harmonica, percussion (all tracks on discs 1 & 2)
Mike Campbell – lead guitar, bass guitar, mandolin, koto (all tracks on discs 1 & 2)
Benmont Tench – piano, keyboards, backing vocals (all tracks on discs 1; tracks 1-6, 12-17 on disc 2)
Scott Thurston – guitar, backing vocals (track 17 on disc 2)
Ron Blair – bass guitar, cello (tracks 1–11 on Disc 1)
Howie Epstein – bass guitar, backing vocals  (tracks 15-17 on disc 1; tracks 1-7, 10, 12-17 on disc 2)
Stan Lynch – drums, percussion, backing vocals (all tracks on disc 1; tracks 1-6, 12-16 on disc 2)  
Steve Ferrone – drums (track 17 on disc 2)

Additional personnel

Jeff Jourard - electric guitar (track 1 on disc 1)
Phil Seymour – backing vocals (tracks 1-2 on disc 1)
Randall Marsh – drums (track 3 on disc 1)
Duck Dunn – bass guitar (tracks 3, 13-14 on disc 1)
Stevie Nicks – lead and backing vocals (track 14 on disc 1)
Jim Keltner – shaker, tambourine (track 8 on disc 1) percussion (track 3 on disc 2), drums, percussion (track 7 on disc 2)
Phil Jones – percussion (tracks 9–17 on disc 1), drums, percussion (tracks 7–11 on disc 2)
John Berry Jr., Dick Braun, Jim Colie, William Bergman, Kurt McGettrick, Molly Duncan, Dave Plews – horns (track 1 on disc 2)
Bobbye Hall - tambourine (track 1 on disc 2)
Dean Garcia – intro bass guitar (track 2 on disc 2)
Daniel Rothmuller – cello (track 2 on disc 2)
Alan Weidel – wild dog piano (track 2 on disc 2)
Stephanie Spruill, Sharon Celani, and Marilyn Martin – backing vocals (track 2 on disc 2)
Dave Stewart – electric sitar, synthesizer, backing vocals (track 2 on disc 2)
Garth Hudson – organ (track 3 on disc 2)
Richard Manuel – backing vocal (track 3 on disc 2)
Gary Chang – synthesizer (track 3 on disc 2)
Jerry Hey – horn conductor, arranger (track 3 on disc 2)
Lee Thornburg – trumpet (track 4 on disc 2)
Carroll Sue Hill, Pat Peterson – backing vocals, percussion (track 4 on disc 2)
Jeff Lynne – bass guitar, guitar, guitar synthesizer, piano, keyboards, backing vocals (tracks 7–14 on disc 2)
George Harrison – acoustic guitar, backing vocals (track 10 on disc 2)
Richard Tandy – synthesizer (track 14 on disc 2)
Chris Trujillo – percussion (track 15 on disc 2) 
The Bangles (Susanna Hoffs, Debbi Peterson, Vicki Peterson, Michael Steele) - backing vocals (track 16 on disc 2)
George Drakoulias – percussion (track 17 on disc 2)
Lenny Castro – percussion (track 17 on disc 2)

Charts

Certifications

References

Tom Petty compilation albums
Albums produced by Denny Cordell
Albums produced by Jimmy Iovine
Albums produced by Rick Rubin
Albums produced by Tom Petty
2000 compilation albums